Phryne before the Areopagus is an 1861 painting by the French artist Jean-Léon Gérôme. The subject matter is Phryne, an ancient Greek hetaira (courtesan) who was put on trial for impiety. Phryne was acquitted after her defender Hypereides removed her robe and exposed her naked bosom, "to excite the pity of her judges by the sight of her beauty."

The painting was exhibited at the 1861 Salon. It is in the collection of the Kunsthalle Hamburg in Germany.

Caricatures
Bernhard Gillam made a famous caricature drawing in 1884 titled Phryne before the Chicago Tribunal, where Phryne is replaced by the Republican Party presidential candidate James G. Blaine, covered in scandals, and Hypereides by the newspaper editor Whitelaw Reid. Teddy Roosevelt can be seen in the front row.

Another caricature followed in 1908, The High Tariff Phryne before the Tribunal.

References

External link

1861 paintings
Nude art
Paintings by Jean-Léon Gérôme
Paintings in the Hamburger Kunsthalle
Women in art
History paintings
Cultural depictions of Phryne